Deh-e Ashuri (also Romanized as Deh-e ʿĀshūrī and Deh-e Āshūrī) is a village in Vardasht Rural District, in the Central District of Semirom County, Isfahan Province, Iran. At the 2006 census, its population was 58, in 9 families.

References 

Populated places in Semirom County